The Crispa Redmanizers were a multi-titled Filipino basketball team that played in the Philippine Basketball Association (PBA) from 1975 to 1984. It was one of the nine founding teams of the PBA, winning a total of thirteen PBA championships, including two grand slams. Founded in 1956 by businessman Valeriano "Danny" Floro, the team was owned by P. Floro and Sons, Inc. (defunct).

Profile and history 

Named after the retail store and textile manufacturing company owned by the Floro family, the Redmanizers were managed by sportsman Danny Floro and coached for many years by the legendary Virgilio "Baby" Dalupan.

The Redmanizer moniker was a reference to the Redmanization process used in Crispa's textile manufacturing to make the cloth dimensionally stable and more resilient to unwanted shrinking after washing. Crispa's garment and textile products were marketed as "Redmanized", "shrunk-to-fit".

Crispa won 13 Philippine Basketball Association (PBA) championships in a span of nine years. Even more amazing is that the Crispa's roster during the PBA inaugural in 1975 had five future Most Valuable Player awardees. In hindsight, this was not a mere championship team; it was an all-star team.

Crispa's beginnings were rooted in 1956 in the Businessman Athletic Association (BAA), a minor league. In 1958, it transferred to the now-defunct Manila Industrial and Commercial Athletic Association (MICAA). In 1971, the team composed of Reynaldo Alcantara, Rudolph Kutch, Ernesto de Leon, Rodolfo Soriano, Danilo Florencio, Johnny Revilla, Adriano Papa, Jr., William "Bogs" Adornado, Virgilio Abarrientos, Danilo Pecache, Domingo Celis, Jr. and Rey Franco lost to the Meralco Reddy Kilowatts in the MICAA championships.

In 1973, authorities discovered that six of the team's players had conspired with gamblers to drop the 1972 MICAA All-Filipino championship series against underdog Mariwasa. These six players, including four of the five starters (only Adornado was found innocent among the starting five), were served lifetime suspensions. With its lineup depleted, manager Valeriano "Danny" Floro and coach Virgilio "Baby" Dalupan were forced to rebuild. They opted to go with younger players, bringing in Mapúa Institute of Technology hotshot Fortunato "Atoy" Co, Jr. and Colegio de San Jose Recoletos standout Abet Guidaben in 1973, and Jose Rizal College’s Philip Cezar and RP Youth Team players Bernie Fabiosa and Alfredo "Freddie" Hubalde in 1974.

In 1974, Crispa began a rivalry for basketball supremacy with Toyota – a team spearheaded by Robert Jaworski, Francis Arnaiz, and Ramon Fernandez, stars of the old Meralco franchise. Nothing came close to the Crispa-Toyota Rivalry. The two teams really hated each other and would rather lose to other teams than to each other. It was not uncommon to have games marred by bench clearing brawls. The two teams also had very different personalities with the fair haired and fair skinned Toyota players appealing more to the upper crust of Philippine society whereas the Redmanizers were perceived to be the team of the masses.

Toyota won the first two PBA conferences in 1975, beating Crispa both times. Crispa finally sneaked in and clinched the Third Conference in a battle so fierce it got marred by a free-for-all. Once the Redmanizers got a taste of the championship, however, they simply did not let go. They won all three conferences in 1976, being the first PBA team to win a "grand slam". They won another two championships in 1977, despite the loss of leading scorer and reigning MVP Adornado to a knee injury at the start of the year.

From 1978 to 1982, however, Crispa went into a title slump. They won no championships in 1978, only the All-Filipino championships in 1979 to 1981, and were blanked once again in 1982. Three conference championships in five years may be good enough for most teams, but not for the powerful Redmanizers.

The team rectified the situation by dissolving the Floro-Dalupan partnership and bringing in former U/Tex coach and president Ferdinand Marcos' son-in-law Tomas "Tommy" Manotoc to serve as coach. The team also got an infusion of young talent as amateur standouts Arturo "Bay" Cristobal, Elpidio "Yoyoy" Villamin, Padim Israel, and Mon Cruz became the newest Redmanizers. To top it all off, Crispa hired import Billy Ray Bates to augment an already awesome cast. The Redmanizers proceeded to dominate the competition, sweeping all three conference championships in 1983, another grand slam.

Crispa's 1983 grand slam campaign, however, could not prevent the inevitable break-up of the team. Arch-rival Toyota had already disbanded prior to the start of the 1984 season as the political and economic turmoil following the assassination of opposition stalwart Senator Ninoy Aquino made it increasingly difficult for companies to finance professional basketball teams. Crispa won the first conference All-Filipino title for a total of 13 franchise titles but played poorly in the remainder of 1984 campaign. On February 1, 1985, PBA Commissioner Mariano Yenko announced the sale of Crispa's PBA franchise to Pilipinas Shell. The sports pages of the day read out the sad and anticlimactic manner by which the legendary team was dismantled.

Season-by-season records

Awards

Individual awards

Notable players
In alphabetical order. Members of PBA Hall of Fame and PBA Greatest Players are in boldface.

Fortunato "Atoy" Co, Jr.  - #5, #6 (1972-1984)
William "Bogs" Adornado - #11 (1970-1979)
Philip Cezar - #18 (1973-1984)
Abet Guidaben - #14, #5 (1973-1984)
Freddie Hubalde - #10 (1974-1984)
Bernie Fabiosa - #21, #15 (1974-1984)
 Alex Azurin (1975)
 Cris Calilan - #23 (1974-1976)
 Jose Bernardo "Joy" Carpio - #29 (1981-1984)
 David Cezar - #16 (1974-1976) 
 Arturo "Bay" Cristobal - #8, #7 (1981-1984)
 Ramon "Mon" Cruz - #14, #4 (1981-1984)
 Virgilio "Bong" dela Cruz - #12 (1974-1981)
 Gregorio "Joy" Dionisio - #9 (1976-1981)
 Rudy Distrito - #19  (1981-1984)
 Angelito "Itoy" Esguerra - #16 (1983-1984)
 Eduardo "Ed" Espinosa - #34 (1979)
 Reynaldo "Rey" Franco - #19 (1971-1977)
 Matthew "Fritz" Gaston - #14 (1983-1984)
 Filomeno "Fil" Gulfin - #24 (1979)
 Joel Gomez- #22(1975)
 Cesar Ijares - #9 (1974-1975)
 Federico "Padim" Israel - #9 (1981-1984)
 Jaime "Jimmy" Javier  - #8, #25 (1978-1979, 1984)
 Eric Leaño - #17, #8 (1973-1975)
 Lim Eng Beng  - #17 (1984)
 Romulo Mamaril - #17 (1980-1983)
 Frank Natividad - #16 (1981)
 Reynaldo Pages - #8 (1973-1978)
 William "Willie" Pearson - #11 (1984)
 Johnny Revilla - #9, #23, #16 (1970-1975)
 Jesus Santa Maria - #17 (1975)
 Rodolfo "Rudy" Soriano - #7 (1970-1977)
 Wilfredo "Willy" Tanduyan - #19 (1978)
 Armando Torres - #17 (1977-1978)
 Reynaldo "Rey" Vallejo - #12, #4 (1974-1975)
 Luis "Tito" Varela - #9, #14, #33 (1976-1981, 1983–1984)
 Elpidio "Yoyoy" Villamin - #12, #13 (1981-1984)

BAA/MBA (1956-1957):
 Carlos Badion
 Gerry Cruz
 Charlie Dudds
 Andy de Jesus
 Dominador Lauron
 Mike Littaua
 Jaime Lucas - #11, #7
 Alberto Nicdao
 Eddie Pacheco
 Eddie Rivera
 Willie Sotelo
 Mario Uson

MICAA (1958-1974):
 Virgilio "Billy" Abarrientos - #14 (1969-1973)
 Luis Afable (1973)
 Reynaldo "Epoy" Alcantara  - #4 (1969-1973)
 Guillermo Baz
 Narciso Bernardo  (1970)
 Dave Brodett - #10 (1974)
 Edgardo "Ed" Carvajal  - #14 (1973-1974)
 Domingo "Jun" Celis, Jr. - #17 (1970)
 Aniceto Chambers
 Romy Diaz - #7
 Cesar Dignos
 Danny Florencio - #8 (1970-1973)
 Robert Flores
 Priscilo Gabuya
 Francisco Henares
 Robert Jaworski (1965)
 Manuel Jocson (1969-1970)
 Rudolf Kutch - #13, #5 (1969-1973)
 Ernesto "Ernie" de Leon - #6 (1970-1973)
 Roehl Nadurata - #13
 Abelardo Ortiz
 Constancio Ortiz - #10
 Adriano "Jun" Papa, Jr. - #10 (1969-1973)
 Bienvenido Papa
 Tomas Paredes
 Danilo Pecache - #15 (1973-1974)
 Leonardo del Pilar
 Dominador Servillano
 Reynaldo Sigua - #22 (1971)
 Pelagio Simon
 Mike Taquintic
 Mariano Tolentino
 James Yap
 Roberto Yburan

Imports
 Herman Barnes (1984)
 Billy Ray Bates "The Black Superman" - #2 (1983)
 Lawrence Boston - #43 (1980)
 Lewis Brown  - #11 (1982)
 Bill Bunton - #33 (1976)
 Johnny Burkes - #24 (1975)
 Irving Chatmann - #55 (1979)
 Pete Crotty - #25 (1975)
 Sylvester Cuyler - #11 (1980)
 Larry Demic - #25 (1983)
 Mike Gibson (1982)
 Al Green - #12 (1981)
 Glenn Hagan - #12 (1982)
 James Hardy  - #11 (1981)
 Bernard Harris - #42 (1979)
 Ricky Hicks (1977)
 Byron "Snake" Jones - #33 (1980-1981)
 Clarence Kea - #3 (1982)
 Cyrus Mann - #25, #27 (1976-1977, 1979)
 Cris McMurray (1977)
 Paul Mills - #32 (1978)
 Glenn Mosley (1980)
 DeWayne Scales - #35 (1983)
 Mike Schultz (1982)
 Ansley Truitt - #43 (1978)
 Cornell Warner - #42 (1979)
 Carlton Willis - #22 (1984)
 James Wright (1982)

MICAA:
 Frank Bucher (1969)
 Larry Bunce (1971; Crispa's tallest import at 7'1")
 Harold Bunton (1969)
 Tom Cowart - #18 (1971)
 Gary Cunningham
 Tine Hardeman
 Bill Jankans (1971)
 Bill Leedom (1969)
 Paul Scranton - #16 (1971)

Head coaches
 Cesar Baldueza (1956)
 Crispin Aldiosa (1956-1957)
 Valerio "Amang" López (1958-1959)
 Francisco Calilan (1960-1961)
 Virgilio "Baby" Dalupan (1962-1982)
 Tommy Manotoc (1983-1984)
 Narciso Bernardo (1984)

Team managers
Valeriano "Danny" L. Floro
Ernesto "Ting" L. Floro (1983)

See also
 Crispa 400
 Crispa–Toyota rivalry
 Crispa (clothing brand)

References

External links
The Crispa files@freedarko.com

 
1956 establishments in the Philippines
Defunct Philippine Basketball Association teams
Manila Industrial and Commercial Athletic Association teams
Basketball teams established in 1956
Basketball teams disestablished in 1985
1985 disestablishments in the Philippines